Westview Cemetery is a historic cemetery in Wadesboro, North Carolina. Located on the west side of the town, south of Henry Street and west of Madison Avenue, it is a  parcel, which has historically been used as the burying ground for the community's African-American population. The only burials known to be of whites are those of the Smith family (marked by an obelisk), whose older family cemetery formed part of the original acquisition.

The historic portion of the cemetery was added to the National Register of Historic Places in 2015.

See also
 National Register of Historic Places listings in Anson County, North Carolina

References

Cemeteries on the National Register of Historic Places in North Carolina
1898 establishments in North Carolina
Buildings and structures in Anson County, North Carolina
National Register of Historic Places in Anson County, North Carolina